Nicholas Napier Birks (born 4 June 1938) is an Australian former athlete active in the 1950s and 1960s.

An old boy of St Peter's College in Adelaide, Birks is the great-grandson of the founder of Charles Birks & Co, a former department store on Rundle Street. He was a nine-time national champion in the javelin and won three national titles in the decathlon. In 1961 he set a British Empire record in the javelin with a throw of 252 ft 4 inches in Sydney.

Birks featured in three editions of the British Empire and Commonwealth Games, the first in Cardiff in 1958, where he was ninth in the javelin. He won bronze in the javelin in 1962 and silver at the same event in 1966.

References

External links

1938 births
Living people
Australian male javelin throwers
Australian decathletes
Athletes (track and field) at the 1958 British Empire and Commonwealth Games
Athletes (track and field) at the 1962 British Empire and Commonwealth Games
Athletes (track and field) at the 1966 British Empire and Commonwealth Games
Commonwealth Games medallists in athletics
Commonwealth Games silver medallists for Australia
Commonwealth Games bronze medallists for Australia
People educated at St Peter's College, Adelaide
Athletes from Adelaide
Medallists at the 1962 British Empire and Commonwealth Games
Medallists at the 1966 British Empire and Commonwealth Games